Kuttikalundu Sookshikkuka is a 2016 Indian Malayalam-language family thriller film written and directed by Kalavoor Ravikumar and produced by Mohanan G. It stars Anoop Menon and Bhavana in lead roles.

Plot
A family that contains commando Gautham Keshav (Anoop Menon), his wife Shahida (Bhavana) and two school-going children Niranjan (Sanoop Santhosh) and Neeraj (Siddharth Ajith). The peaceful existence of the family is ousted after Gautham is killed by a group of terrorists.

As Shahida puts on a brave front to lead a normal life for the children, the two children decide to retaliate for the demise of their dad after recognizing the leader of a terrorist group amid a school trip. During the terrorists case investigation, Merin (Anumol) helps the family out. The boys keeps  Kareem Ustad (Makarand Deshpande) the terrorist leader who killed Gautham and tells him that they will get him revenge on  Indian Independence Day. They put posters to remind him. During scenes, they cry over their dead father. They plan to hoist the flag, and burn him to death. They hoist the flag, ask him to say a line, then they salute the flag. But, Kareem tries to kill Niranjan. Then, Neeraj sprays a liquid onto Kareem's face. Merin and Shahida find the kids and Kareem, and they are presented with an award, and are congratulated by the ones present in the room, including their grandpa and grandma, and the brother's father, that is Shahida's husband, the late Gautham Keshav. It ends with a salute to soldiers, for protecting our nation.

Cast
 Sanoop Santhosh as Niranjan Keshav Khadar
 Siddharth Ajith as Neeraj Keshav Khadar
 Anoop Menon as Gautham Keshav
 Bhavana  as Shahida Keshav
 Anumol as Merin
 Makarand Deshpande as Kareem Ustaad

Production
The film began production in July 2016, with Kalavoor Ravikumar opting to direct the film, produced by Mohanan G and starring Anoop Menon in the lead role.

Choreographer of this movie is Sajnanajam.

Soundtrack
Music is composed by Bijibal.
"Himagiri" - Prabha Varma
"Dhoore Vaanil" - Prabha Varma

References

2016 films
2010s Malayalam-language films
Indian comedy films
Films scored by Bijibal